The Senova (BAIC) X25 is a subcompact crossover based on the Senova D20 hatchback produced by Senova, a sub-brand of BAIC Motor.

Overview
Debuting on the 2015 Chengdu Auto Show in China, the pricing of the X25 starts at 55,800 yuan and ends at 75,800 yuan, positioning the crossover under the larger subcompact Senova X35 CUV. There is only one engine offered for the Senova X25, which is a Mitsubishi-sourced 1.5 liter inline-four engine producing 116hp and 148nm, mated to a five-speed manual gearbox powering the front wheels. A 1.5 liter turbo engine mated to a four-speed automatic gearbox was added to the line-up in 2016.

BJEV EX360
The BJEV EX360 is the NEV version of the Senova X25. With most of the structure being exactly the same as the regular Senova X25, the only visual differences are the subtile blue accents added on the exterior. The BJEV EX360 has a top speed of 125km/hr, and a maximum torque of 230Nm.

BJEV EC5/ Beijing EC5
The BJEV EC5 and later the Beijing EC5 is the facelifted EX360 NEV featuring redesigned front and rear ends while continuing to utilize the same powertrain and battery. The EC5 debuted during the 2019 Shanghai Auto Show as an update to be more inline with the rest of the BJEV models.

The BJEV EX360 and EC5 is equipped with an electric motor producing 80 kW (107 hp) and 230 N.m / 170 lb.ft torque, and connected to a 48.14kWh battery. The NEDC tested range is 403 kilometers. Deliveries for the BJEV EC5 started in July 2019.

References

External links 

 Official Senova X25 Website
 Official BJEV EX360 Website

X25
Crossover sport utility vehicles
2010s cars
Cars introduced in 2015
Cars of China
Production electric cars